2.0 is a 2018 Indian Tamil-language superhero film directed by S. Shankar who co-wrote the film with B. Jeyamohan and Madhan Karky. Produced by Subaskaran under the banner of Lyca Productions. As the second instalment in the Enthiran film series, 2.0 is a standalone sequel to Enthiran (2010), featuring Rajinikanth reprising the roles of Vaseegaran and Chitti the Robot, alongside Akshay Kumar as Pakshi Rajan and Amy Jackson as Nila. also Sudhanshu Pandey, Adil Hussain, Kalabhavan Shajohn, and K. Ganesh appear in supporting roles. The soundtrack is composed by A. R. Rahman, with lyrics written by Madhan Karky and Na. Muthukumar. The film follows the conflict between Chitti, the once dismantled humanoid robot, and Pakshi Rajan, a former ornithologist who seeks vengeance upon cell phone users to prevent avian population decline.

Produced on an estimated budget of 400–600 crore, 2.0 is the most expensive Indian film at the time of its release and one of the most expensive till date. Production began in 2015, with principal photography conducted at AVM Studios later that year. The first schedule was filmed at EVP World. Scenes were primarily shot in India, particularly in Chennai's Madras Boat Club and Delhi's Jawaharlal Nehru Stadium. Filming was completed by August 2017. The film is the first in Indian cinema to be natively shot in 3D, which was done by cinematographer Nirav Shah. The film was primarily shot in Tamil while Akshay Kumar and some actors' dialogues were shot in Hindi. Legacy Effects made their return to construct prosthetic makeup and animatronics, with visual effects supervised by V. Srinivas Mohan. Editing was handled by Anthony and production design was conducted by T. Muthuraj.

2.0 was released worldwide in both 3D and conventional format on 29 November 2018, along with its Hindi and Telugu dubbed version. It received mostly positive reviews, with praise directed towards the film's storyline, direction, performances of Rajinikanth and Akshay Kumar, visual effects, action sequences, soundtrack and social message, although the screenplay received some criticism. The movie earned  worldwide on its first day, which was the fourth-highest ever for an Indian film. The film crossed  in its opening weekend to be the highest-grossing film worldwide for that week and the worldwide collection was ₹655800 crore after end of four weeks. 2.0 is the seventh highest-grossing film in India and is the ninth highest-grossing Indian film worldwide. 2.0 is currently the highest-grossing Tamil film of all time.

Plot
 

8 years after the events of first film, Dr. Vaseegaran builds an android humanoid assistant named Nila, short for "Nice, Intelligent, Loving Assistant" and introduces her to a group of college students, explaining her abilities. He reminisces about Chitti, his previous creation which was dismantled after an error Nila was built in response to.

Shortly after, all the mobile phones in the city fly into the sky, throwing the public into a panic. A council assembles to discuss the phenomenon, in which Vaseegaran suggests reactivating Chitti. However, the plan is opposed by a member of the council, Dhinendra Bohra, whose father was killed by Chitti a few years back. But after the cell phones gather into a swarm and kill businessman Manoj Lulla, Telecom Minister Vairamurthy and cellphone showroom owner Jayanth Kumar, the now terrified Home Minister S. Vijay Kumar allows Vaseegaran to reactivate Chitti.

As the cell phone swarm causes chaos in the city in the form of a giant bird, a newly activated and upgraded Chitti arrives and battles the bird, during which Chitti runs out of battery and recharges between three antennas at a space station. The swarm tries to follow but is repelled by the antennas. Chitti informs Vaseegaran about this incident and confirms that the phones are powered by an aura, specifically a concentrated mass of negative charge with electromagnetic properties. Since the space station was streaming positive charged ions into space, the swarm was repelled. Vaseegaran builds a photon synthesizer that projects positive charge, tracks the cell phones along with Chitti and neutralises the charge of the bird. Defeated in the confrontation, the phones take up a humanoid form, as the deceased ornithologist Pakshi Rajan.

Chitti converses with Pakshi as he attempts to destroy the synthesizer, in which a flashback reveals that Pakshi protested against the usage of modern mobile phones, radiation from which caused mass deaths of birds, especially near his bird sanctuary and home in Thirukazhukundram. Pakshi tries to draw the attention of the public, but his protests are dismissed by the public who mock him. Birds all over the city including Pakshi's sanctuary die out, including newborn chicks. Even a court investigation finds no violations because of manipulation by the telecom companies, which drives him to suicide by hanging in a cell tower. Pakshi's negatively charged spirit reawakens by the radiation emitting from the tower. By absorbing the souls of the dead birds, he becomes a vengeful entity, promising to avenge the birds' deaths and change people's attitude towards birds and the environment.

Empathizing with Pakshi, Chitti tries to convince him not to hurt the public, especially the innocent ones, but Pakshi denies this stating no one is innocent, wishing to punish their ignorance. Left with no choice, Chitti has Pakshi captured and contained after much effort. Vaseegaran is congratulated by the country, and the news spreads to the council which decides to build an army of robots such as Chitti for the military. However, Dhinendra, angered by Chitti's victory, releases Pakshi's spirit from the synthesizer vehicle. Pakshi, now free and wanting to continue his mission ambushes and possesses Vaseegaran in his house, and attacks the public again. Chitti arrives with Nila to see chaos everywhere and confronts Vaseegaran, only to realise Pakshi has taken over his body. Chitti hesitates to attack Pakshi, as it would result in Vaseegaran dying as well, since his body is occupied by Pakshi. Taking advantage of this, Pakshi taunts and dismantles it. Pakshi flies off after Vaseegaran writes '2.0' for Nila to read on the scrap of a damaged car, seeing which she immediately goes to Vaseegaran's lab, reprograms Chitti to its 2.0 alter ego, and alters it to not harm the public and only to fight Pakshi.

Pakshi, now in Vaseegaran's form, goes to a football stadium with 80,000 people and traps them in it, and finding out that Dhinendra, who was present, uses his cell phone, incinerates him alive by focusing radiation from multiple cell towers, despite the fact that he freed him. Chitti arrives with a robot army and confronts Pakshi. Pakshi fails to taunt Chitti by using Vaseegaran because of the 2.0 version's hatred towards Vaseegaran. Both of them assume giant forms and fight each other. Initially Chitti gains the upper hand but Pakshi manages to overpower him and cause him to run out of charge. Pakshi assumes his winged form and creates several bird drones which tear Chitti's fellow robots into pieces, but before Pakshi can summon radiation and continue his plan, he gets interrupted by an action figure sized robot "Kutti 3.0" made by Chitti. Released into the stadium by Nila, the Kutti bots mount themselves on doves and threaten to fly them into Pakshi's radiation beam, forcing Pakshi to stand down till the Kuttis self-destruct and destroy Pakshi's drones. After Vaseegaran is released from Pakshi's possession, Pakshi is led to the space station where it is destroyed.

Vaseegaran recovers in the hospital and tells Vijay Kumar that he feels Pakshi was a virtuous person who became a victim of the corrupt society. He suggests they reduce and control cell phone radiation to ensure that technology does not threaten living beings. Vijay Kumar promises to get this passed in the next Parliament hearing. Chitti, now restored to its original version, begins a relationship with Nila as they and the other robots go to report at the Delhi headquarters.

In a post-credits scene, Sana asks Vaseegaran over the phone about the odds of mobile phones flying again. Immediately, Vaseegaran's mobile flies out of his hand and morphs into Kutti 3.0, saying, "I am your grandson".

Cast

Production

Development 

The commercial success of Enthiran (2010) prompted the makers of the film to immediately consider making a sequel. By March 2011, the original film's cinematographer, Rathnavelu, revealed that initial pre-production work on a sequel had begun with the same technical team. S. Shankar, the director of Enthiran, moved on to work on Nanban (2012) and I (2015) and planned to reunite with the same producers as the original was released, with Shankar revealing that he was unsure if the film "will happen at all" during an interview in 2014. While finishing the production of I, Shankar drafted the scripts of three more feature films, including a sequel to Enthiran.

Pre-production work for the film had reportedly started in June 2015 with Lyca Productions deciding to finance the project. Along with Shankar and Rajinikanth, composer A. R. Rahman and editor Anthony remained on the development team for the sequel, while Jeyamohan was added to write the screenplay. Shankar also began briefing the film's art director T. Muthuraj and visual effects supervisor V. Srinivas Mohan about their involvement in the film. Shankar had initially inquired about K. V. Anand's availability. This was before Nirav Shah joined the technical team as a cinematographer in mid-2015 and visited specialist studios in the United States to research filming methods for 3D shoots.

Jeyamohan finished work on the script of the film in September 2015 and revealed that the story would be a direct continuation of the 2010 film, with filming only set to start following the completion of Rajinikanth's commitments in Kabali (2016). The original film's screenplay writer, Madhan Karky, helped Jeyamohan on some of the more technical dialogue in the script. While the film does include characters and references to events from its predecessor, it is primarily a standalone sequel. A press release coinciding with the start of the film's shoot also revealed that Resul Pookutty would handle sound designing, Legacy Effects would take care of animatronics work and Mary E. Vogt would design special costumes. Stunt choreographer Kenny Bates and visual effects specialists John Hughes and Walt Jones of Tau Films were also signed to work on the film. Unadjusted for inflation, 2.0 was the most expensive Indian film at the time of its release.

Casting 

Shankar held initial discussions with Kamal Haasan, Aamir Khan, and then Vikram about portraying a further role, though none of the three actors signed on to appear in the film. Subsequently, the team held talks with Hollywood actor Arnold Schwarzenegger for the role, who agreed to work on the film for a record remuneration. The makers then opted against signing Schwarzenegger, though there have been conflicting reasons regarding this decision. British actress Amy Jackson signed on to work on the film in October 2015 and visited Los Angeles as a part of the team's pre-production work. In late November 2015, Rajinikanth also travelled to Los Angeles to meet the film's producers and complete costume trials and initial motion capture effects work for the film. After further negotiations with actors including Hrithik Roshan and Neil Nitin Mukesh, the makers signed on Akshay Kumar to portray the role for which Schwarzenegger was initially considered.

Sudhanshu Pandey joined the cast of the film in March 2016 and revealed that he would portray a scientist who is the son of Professor Bohra from the original film. Adil Hussain began working on the film in July 2016, and, as a part of his role, undertook extensive research into the life of news reporters. In September 2016, Malayalam actor Kalabhavan Shajohn confirmed that he had tried out for a role in the film after Shankar was impressed with his performance in Drishyam and had signed him on.

Filming

An official launch event was to be held on 12 December 2015, coinciding with Rajinikanth's birthday. However, the team chose to avoid publicity as a result of the 2015 South Indian floods. Instead, the team held a low key launch event at the AVM Studios on 7 December, with the director and the producers in attendance. Titled 2.0, the film then began its first scheduled shooting on 16 December 2015 at a set erected in the outskirts of Chennai at EVP World. On the first day of the shoot, a scene featuring Rajinikanth and several dwarf actors was shot at the erected set, while the team's principal cast and crew also assembled for a photoshoot. The first schedule of the film, consisting of Rajinikanth and Amy Jackson, continued in Chennai until 30 December 2015. The team then worked on a second schedule throughout the middle of January 2016 in Chennai and shot scenes featuring Rajinikanth at Mohan Studios and by Madras Boat Club. Shankar continued filming portions not involving the lead actors throughout February 2016 in Chennai, with a car chase sequence shot in Royapettah. Another schedule to shoot a song was initially set to be held at Salar de Uyuni in Bolivia but was cancelled due to bad weather, and the team opted not to travel to the country.

Akshay began shooting for the film in Chennai at the beginning of March 2016 and took part in a schedule held at the EVP Film City studio in Chennai. A set of a mobile phone store was built on-site, while night scenes involving robotic equipment and military tanks were also canned. The team subsequently moved to Delhi in order to hold a forty-five-day schedule, continuing on from the same scenes with military tanks that were shot in Chennai. Subsequently, the team filmed sequences at Jawaharlal Nehru Stadium depicting an Indian Super League match between Chennaiyin FC and Mumbai City FC, with hundreds of junior artists recruited to act as supporters. Actors Amitabh Bachchan and Abhishek Bachchan visited the film's set at the stadium with the media reporting that the pair were set to make cameo appearances, though the claim was later denied by the team. Rajinikanth then joined the team in Delhi at the end of March to continue shooting for the project, with the climax sequences being filmed. Action scenes incorporating robotic equipment were filmed throughout early April in Delhi, with cinematographer Nirav Shah using helicams to capture sequences involving the three lead actors.

Another ten-day schedule took place in May 2016 in Chennai, with scenes being shot at the EVP Film City studios as well as at The Forum Vijaya shopping mall. During the shoot at the studios, the visual effects designer Srinivas Mohan digitally converted a green screen sequence into locations including the Red Fort and the Parliament from Delhi after the team were unable to secure shooting permission there. By June 2016, Shankar revealed that after one hundred days of shooting, scenes including the climax and two major action sequences had been completed and that the film was fifty percent complete. Adil Hussain and Kalabhavan Shajohn began their work in the film during July 2016 in Chennai, while the rest of the cast were given an extended break after Rajinikanth fell ill. Production continued throughout August and early September 2016 without the lead actors in Saligramam in Chennai, where the team shot action sequences of luxury cars being blown up. Following his illness and subsequent recovery, Rajinikanth returned to the sets of the film in early October after a break of close to four months. He shot for scenes alongside Amy Jackson in Chennai, where he was featured fighting huge birds created using animatronic technology with actor Riyaz Khan also joining the cast, but eventually he was not included in the final cast of the film. Soon after the schedule finished in early October, Shankar revealed that the film was two-thirds complete, following one hundred and fifty days of shooting.

Another schedule began in early November at EVP Film City in Chennai with all of the lead cast and continued throughout the month. All filming was completed except for one song that featured a set erected in Chennai. Jackson was given ten days of practice by choreographer Bosco. Filming was completed in August 2017. Principal photography was concluded on 22 October 2017.

Music

A. R. Rahman composed the film's soundtrack and score, during the pre-production works of the film, in December 2015. Recording of the songs took place for nearly four years. In an interview with Archana Chandhok on Zee Tamil, Rajinikanth revealed that director Shankar wanted to make 2.0 without any songs. However, Rahman was still not convinced and felt that an album should have a minimum of four songs to provide listeners with a wholesome experience.

A promotional music event for the film was held at Burj Al Arab, Dubai on 27 October 2017, in a grand manner. And on the same day, two tracks from the film, "Endhira Logathu Sundhariye" and "Rajaali" were released, in Tamil and dubbed versions in Telugu and Hindi Madhan Karky and Na. Muthukumar provided the lyrics for the songs in Tamil. The third track, "Pullinangal" was included in the part of the soundtrack album on 6 November 2018.

The film score was released on 29 June 2019. Recording of the original score began in London and Rahman's Los Angeles studios in 2016. Unlike previous projects, Rahman began finalising the original background score six months back prior to release because he felt that the scenes were very heavy and it needed a lot of work.

Marketing and release 
In November 2016, it was revealed that 2.0 was scheduled for release during Diwali on 18 October 2017. In April 2017, Raju Mahalingam, the film's former producer, announced that the film's release had been postponed to 25 January 2018 citing better incorporation of visual effects. The release date was later moved to 14 April 2018. The release date was once again moved to 27 April 2018 but instead Kaala took that spot resulting in another delay of the film. The making video of the film was revealed on 25 August 2017. The film, which contains approximately 1,000 visual effects shots according to producers, was delayed numerous times while the computer-generated imagery (CGI) work was being completed by numerous effects studios. The film was finally slated to be released in cinemas on 29 November 2018.

The teaser of 2.0 was released on Ganesh Chaturti, 13 September 2018, in both 3D and 2D. The 3D version was positively received, while some expressed disappointment with the 2D. Its 2D teaser video has been viewed over 32 million times in 24 hours. The film topic was trended and top searched queries on Google Trends for a week. But the teaser did not mention the release date. According to the source, "There may be a lot of VFX work left in the film and they do not want to delay things too much. This is why, the makers Lyca Productions seem to have put out the teaser so that they can keep the audiences busy." In addition to its original language, the film will be released in 14 other languages with dubbed versions.

Ahead of the film's release, the Cellular Operators Association of India (COAI) lodged a complaint, demanding that the Central Board of Film Certification (CBFC) certificate of the film be revoked for "promoting anti-scientific attitudes towards mobile phones and cellular networks". The organisation alleged the producers "falsely depicting mobile phones and mobile towers as harmful to living creatures and the environment including birds and human beings". Meanwhile, a Lyca Productions spokesperson said, "We are under no obligation to toe the line and the film does not hunt or defames anyone." Various studies in India have proven that electromagnetic radiation from cell sites has a detrimental effect on bird health.

In China, the film released on 6 September 2019. It was said to be released by HY Media in 10,000 theatres with 56,000 screenings, which includes 47,000 3D screenings, which is the largest release ever for an Indian film in the country in May 2019, with a Mandarin dub and subtitles, but the release was delayed to 6 September 2019 and released in about 48,000 screens. A dubbed Russian-language version of the film will also release in Russia on 25 July 2019.

Reception

Critical response

India 
2.0 received generally positive reviews from critics in India. Shankar's direction, visual effects, performances of Rajinikanth and Kumar, suspense, and social message received praise, while the screenplay drew criticism. Taran Adarsh gave the film five stars out of five and applauded Shankar as "a visionary... He hits the ball out of the park this time. Akshay Kumar is fantastic, while Rajinikanth is the boss". A critic for Bollywood Hungama gave it four and a half stars out of five and similarly commended Shankar, "[His] direction is highly effective and he proves once again why he's one of our best filmmakers. He doesn't get overwhelmed by the technology available and makes correct use of it". S Subhakeerthana of The Indian Express gave it four stars out of five: "Shankar has raised the bar in filmmaking in terms of visualisation, grandeur, and every frame of his fascinates you as a viewer". Business Todays Ramesh Bala gave it four stars out of five, and found Kumar to be the film's spotlight: "He has rocked both as Birdman and as a normal man in an emotional flashback".

Writing for Hindustan Times, Raja Sen rated 2.0 three and a half stars out of five, terming Rajinikanth as "smarter than a smartphone" and counted him and Kumar among the film's strengths. A critic for the Indo-Asian News Service also gave three and a half stars out of five and wrote, "Unlike most science-fiction films, 2.0 takes the commercial route to entertain, thus does come across as illogical at places, but that's what makes it insanely fun". Devesh Sharma of Filmfare also gave three and a half stars out of five. M. Suganth of The Times of India gave it three stars out of five; he stated that there is a sense of "just going through the motions in the first half," but found that the action sequences and chemistry between the leads helped keep the film enjoyable for most of its run-time. Writing for Film Companion, Anupama Chopra also gave the film three stars out of five: "2.0 is visually overpowering – the VFX are mostly first-rate – but the screenplay doesn't offer the seamless mix of romance, drama and comedy [as the predecessor]".

Janani K, film critic for India Today, gave 2.0 three stars out of five and appreciated the film's theme, but felt it could be better presented, writing, "Though it is a much-need message, it could have been explained in an intriguing manner rather than the pedantic treatment it gets". Rajeev Masand also gave it three stars out of five. Shubhra Gupta of The Indian Express gave the film two stars out of five, describing it as "dull as ditchwater in the first half, perking up a little in the second, with a half-way watchable Akshay Kumar, and a Rajinikanth coming into his own right towards the end, for a bit". Pragati Saxena of National Herald concurred with Gupta and criticised the pace and dullness of the film. Writing for News18, Rohit Vats also rated two stars out of five and criticised the writing, opining, "[Shankar's] characters haven't evolved the way the world around them has". Saibal Chatterjee of NDTV also gave two stars out of five and said, "Bunkum is bunkum no matter how big the bucks behind it are". Ananda Vikatan rated the film 47 out of 100.

Overseas 
Simon Abrahams of RogerEbert.com gave the film three and a half stars out of four and stated, "Against all reason–against all common sense–2.0 works, and in a big, big way". Shilpa Jamkhandikar of Reuters wrote, "This film certainly has the look and feel of a big-ticket Hollywood production, and that alone is worth the price of the ticket". Kumar Shyam of The National gave it three and a half stars out of five and wrote, "2.0 is a very clever spectacle not to be missed for its sheer audacity and scale". Rafael Motamayor of Polygon wrote, "2.0's biggest draw is its impressive use of visual effects, and the film doesn't waste a moment to showcase its budget". He felt "[t]he effects [were] detailed enough to stand against a $200 million-dollar American blockbuster". The movie was screened for the school students in Nepal.

Box office 
2.0 was released in about 6900 screens in India and over 2000 screens overseas. On its opening day, 2.0 earned about  gross collection in India (all versions), which was the second highest ever for an Indian film after Baahubali 2: The Conclusion (2017)'s . This was around  64 crore nett. On its second day, the film went on to be number one at the Australian box office. In Malaysia, the film had an all-time highest opening for any Tamil film. On its second day, the film earned around  45 crore nett in India. The all-India business of 2.0 increased to  56–57 crore nett on Saturday (the third day) owing to positive word-of-mouth in North India, while the collections in South India saw a minor drop. Its all-India total increased to  165.5 crore nett. On its third day, the film earned around  worldwide in all languages, including  from overseas markets.

At the American box office, the film surpassed the lifetime business of Rajinikanth's previous film Lingaa (2014) in just two days. The film debuted at number 11 at the American box office, earning $4.09 million. The screen count was increased from 20 to 75 in Pakistan on its second day to meet the demand. 2.0 grossed US$14.75million ( 1.03billion) in first five days in overseas markets. Collections in India, discounting overseas, were  gross ( 229 crore nett) in all languages. This pushed it ahead of Enthiran, which was the previous highest-grossing film from Tamil cinema with an earning of  205 crore nett in India. In its four-day opening weekend, the film opened at number one at the United Arab Emirates box office, earning $2.5 million, ahead of Creed II (2018).

On its fifth day, the film earned around ₹451 crore (US$56 million) worldwide in all languages, including ₹114 crore (US$16 million) from international markets. In North India, its Hindi version earned around ₹111 crore (US$16 million). Along with the sixth day business of  24 crore nett, the film earned  282.31 crore nett in India. It did record business in the southern Indian states of Tamil Nadu and Kerala. By the end of seven days, the film earned  worldwide, which included  in India and US$15million ( 1.18billion) in overseas markets.

Accolades

Notes

References

External links 

2.0 on Bollywood Hungama

Enthiran
2018 films
2010s Tamil-language films
2018 science fiction action films
Indian science fiction action films
Science fantasy films
2018 3D films
Indian 3D films
Films shot in Delhi
Films set in Chennai
Robot films
Android (robot) films
Films shot in Ukraine
Films directed by S. Shankar
Films set in the future
Films scored by A. R. Rahman
Techno-thriller films
2010s fantasy action films